Charlotte Cardin (born November 9, 1994) is a Canadian pop, electro and jazz singer and songwriter from Montreal, Quebec. Cardin began her career as a model at the age of 15, where she appeared in numerous advertising campaigns such as Barilà.

Career 
A Top 4 finalist in the first season of the TVA singing competition La Voix in 2013, later the same year she was featured on Garou's album Au milieu de ma vie as a duet vocalist on the single "Du vent, des mots". On March 1, 2014, she appeared on the sister series The Voice: la plus belle voix in France to perform the song with Garou, a judge on that edition.

She released her solo debut EP, Big Boy, in 2016 on Cult Nation Records. The EP featured songs in both English and French, and included rapper Nate Husser as a featured artist on "Like It Doesn't Hurt". She was a shortlisted SOCAN Songwriting Prize finalist in the French division for her song "Les échardes", and the title track "Big Boy" was playlisted on CBC Radio 2 and charted on the Radio 2 Top 20. She made an appearance on the talk show Tout le monde en parle to discuss her mini-album in November 2016.

For the 2017 SOCAN Songwriting Prize, she was a nominee in the English category for "Big Boy" and in the French category for "Faufile", becoming the first artist in the history of the award to be nominated in both categories in the same year.

In 2017, she released her second EP, Main Girl. The title track reached No. 1 on the Radio 2 Top 20.

She received two Juno Award nominations at the Juno Awards of 2018, for Breakthrough Artist of the Year and Songwriter of the Year for "Main Girl", "Paradise Motion" and "The Kids".

In 2018, she received another SOCAN Songwriting Prize nomination for "Main Girl".

In 2019, Cardin and producer CRi collaborated on a cover of Daniel Bélanger's "Fous n'importe où", and Cardin appeared on Loud's album Tout ça pour ça as a duet vocalist on the track "Sometimes, All the Time". In 2020 she released the singles "Passive Aggressive" and "Daddy"; both tracks were recorded for her full-length debut album Phoenix, which was released on April 23, 2021. Phoenix is co-written with Cardin's longtime manager Jason Brando of Cult Nation.

In September 2021 she released two non-album songs through the Spotify Singles series, a cover of Amy Winehouse's "Back to Black" and a French-language version of her own "XOXO".

Phoenix won the Felix Award for Anglophone Album of the Year at the 43rd Félix Awards. Cardin also won the awards for Anglophone Concert of the Year and Most Successful Artist Outside Quebec.

Cardin was the most-nominated artist at the Juno Awards of 2022, receiving nods for Artist of the Year, Album of the Year for Phoenix, Pop Album of the Year for Phoenix, Single of the Year and Video of the Year for "Meaningless", and the Fan Choice Award.

Personal life

Cardin grew up in the Montreal suburb of Mount Royal. She is in a relationship with actor Aliocha Schneider.

Band members
 Benjamin Courcy – drums 
 Mathieu Sénéchal – bass guitar, musical director and co-writer of Daddy.

Discography

Studio albums

Extended plays

Charted singles

As lead artist

As featured artist

Other charted songs

Notes

References

Canadian women pop singers
Canadian women singer-songwriters
French-language singers of Canada
Singers from Montreal
Living people
Participants in Canadian reality television series
1994 births
21st-century Canadian women singers
Félix Award winners
Juno Award for Artist of the Year winners
Juno Award for Pop Album of the Year winners
Juno Award for Single of the Year winners
Juno Award for Album of the Year winners